Piscis Hotel is a hotel located at the Las Leñas ski resort in Mendoza, Argentina.

Casino Las Leñas
It currently houses the Casino Las Leñas, the highest casino by elevation in the world.

References

External links

Buildings and structures in Mendoza, Argentina
Casinos completed in 1983
Hotels established in 1983
Hotel buildings completed in 1983